Lucian Maxinianu (born 29 October 1972) is a Romanian weightlifter. He competed in the men's featherweight event at the 1996 Summer Olympics.

References

External links
 

1972 births
Living people
Romanian male weightlifters
Olympic weightlifters of Romania
Weightlifters at the 1996 Summer Olympics
Sportspeople from Brăila
20th-century Romanian people
21st-century Romanian people